Rajub (also Romanized as Rājūb; also known as Rājū) is a village in Chehel Shahid Rural District, in the Central District of Ramsar County, Mazandaran Province, Iran. At the 2006 census, its population was 602, in 171 families.

References 

Populated places in Ramsar County